2020/21 in 60 metres lists the World Best Year Performance in the indoor season 2020/21 in both the men's and the women's 60 metres.

Records

Men top 60

Women top 60

See also
 2020 in 100 metres

References

External links
 

2020/21
100 metres Year Ranking, 2020/21